Sarcoporia is a genus of polypore fungi in the family Polyporaceae. The genus was circumscribed by Petter Karsten in 1894, with the widespread fungus Sarcoporia polyspora as the type species.

Species
Sarcoporia longitubulata Vlasák & Spirin (2015) – USA; Macaronesia
Sarcoporia neotropica Ryvarden (2012) – Costa Rica
Sarcoporia polyspora P.Karst. (1894) – Asia; Europe; North America; South America

The fungus Sarcoporia salmonicolor (Berk. & M.A.Curtis) Teixeira 1986 was made the type species of the monotypic genus Erastia in 2005.

References

Taxa described in 1894
Polyporaceae
Polyporales genera
Taxa named by Petter Adolf Karsten